The Midwest Athletic Conference is an OHSAA athletic league located in west-central Ohio formed in 1972. The Midwest Athletic Conference (MAC) is among the elite small school conferences in the nation. Touted as one of the toughest, if not the toughest, small school conference in America.

Current members

Former members

Membership history

MAC Rivalries
Coldwater/St. Henry
New Bremen/Minster
Fort Recovery/St. Henry
Marion Local/St. Henry
New Bremen/New Knoxville
Coldwater/Delphos St. John's
Coldwater/Marion Local
Fort Recovery/Parkway
Marion Local/Versailles

Non-Conference Rivalries
Delphos St. John's/Lima Central Catholic
Parkway/Crestview
Fort Recovery/Jay County
Coldwater/Celina
Coldwater/Kenton (Football)
Minster/Anna
Versailles/Russia
Minster/Fort Loramie
Anna/Lehman Catholic
New Knoxville/Botkins

Sports fielded

Football Championships

By Year

State championships
The Midwest Athletic Conference has proven to be one of the most competitive in the state of Ohio. Since the inception of the conference in 1973, the 10 member teams have been crowned state champions 147 times. All 10 MAC members have all won a team state title. The MAC has a total of 71 total state championships in boys sports (39 in football) and 74 girls team state championships.

See also
Ohio High School Athletic Conferences

References

External links
https://www.midwestathleticconference.com/ (Conference Website)

Ohio high school sports conferences